Linval Laird (born 23 June 1969) is a retired Jamaican athlete who specialised in the 400 metres. He won several medals with the Jamaican 4 × 400 metres relay including the silver at the 1997 World Indoor Championships. His biggest individual achievement is the bronze at the 1997 Summer Universiade.

He has personal bests of 45.49 seconds outdoors (San Juan 1997) and 46.61 seconds indoors (Boston 1994).

Competition record

References

1969 births
Living people
Jamaican male sprinters
Athletes (track and field) at the 1994 Commonwealth Games
Commonwealth Games silver medallists for Jamaica
Commonwealth Games medallists in athletics
Universiade medalists in athletics (track and field)
Universiade silver medalists for Jamaica
Universiade bronze medalists for Jamaica
World Athletics Indoor Championships medalists
Medalists at the 1991 Summer Universiade
Medalists at the 1997 Summer Universiade
Medallists at the 1994 Commonwealth Games